The Roma–Giardinetti railway is a narrow gauge on-street railway which connects Laziali (a regional train station some  from Termini's main concourse) with Giardinetti to the east just past the Grande Raccordo Anulare, Rome's orbital motorway. It is run by ATAC, the company responsible for public transportation in the city, which also operates the Rome Metro.

History
The present railway is the only part of the old and longer Rome–Fiuggi–Alatri–Frosinone railway to be in service. The latest shortening of the line occurred in 2008 with the closing of the Giardinetti–Pantano section, which has now become part of the Metro Line C.

The line had been due to be dismantled in 2016 to be replaced with a bus lane along Via Casilina, but in March 2015 it was announced that the line would instead be retained and modernised.

References

External links
Atac official website
Map of transport in Rome

Railway lines in Lazio
Transport in Rome
950 mm gauge railways in Italy
1650 V DC railway electrification